Khurshed Mahmudov (born 8 August 1982) is a Tajikistani footballer who plays Tajik League side Regar-TadAZ Tursunzoda, and is a former member of the Tajikistan national football team.

Career
In February 2014, after 12 years with Regar-TadAZ Tursunzoda, Makhmudov signed for FC Istiklol. After two seasons, and 52 appearances for Istiklol, Makhmudov's contract wasn't renewed in January 2016 and he left Istiklol.

In February 2017, Makhmudov switched to Futsal, joining DISI Invest. After six-months with DISI Invest, Makhmudov returned to football, signing with Regar-TadAZ Tursunzoda.

Career statistics

Club

International

Statistics accurate as of match played 29 March 2016

International Goals

Honours

Club
Regar-TadAZ
Tajik League (6): 2002, 2003, 2004, 2006, 2007, 2008
Tajik Cup (4): 2005, 2006, 2011, 2012
AFC President's Cup (1): 2009
Istiklol
Tajik League (2): 2014, 2015
Tajik Cup (1): 2014, 2015
Tajik Supercup (2): 2014, 2015

International
Tajikistan
AFC Challenge Cup (1): 2006

References

External links

1982 births
Living people
Tajikistani footballers
Tajikistan international footballers
Tajikistan Higher League players
FC Istiklol players
Sportspeople from Dushanbe
Association football midfielders
Footballers at the 2006 Asian Games
Asian Games competitors for Tajikistan